Jiří Kodeš (17 February 1933 – 2 March 2006) was a Czechoslovak sprint canoer who competed in the late 1950s and early 1960s. He won two bronze medals at the 1958 ICF Canoe Sprint World Championships in Prague, earning them in the C-2 1000 m and C-2 10000 m events.

Kodeš also finished fifth in the C-2 1000 m event at the 1960 Summer Olympics in Rome.

References

Sports-reference.com profile

1933 births
2006 deaths
Canoeists at the 1960 Summer Olympics
Czech male canoeists
Czechoslovak male canoeists
Olympic canoeists of Czechoslovakia
ICF Canoe Sprint World Championships medalists in Canadian